is Pink Lady's 18th single, released on May 21, 1980. At the time of the single's release, the duo returned to Japan after failing to make a mark in the U.S. with their ill-fated variety show. At the same time, rumors started circulating about Pink Lady's disbandment, which was denied by the duo until they made an official announcement in a press conference on September 1.

The single sold 150,000 copies.

Track listing (7" vinyl) 
All lyrics are written by Akira Itō; all music is composed and arranged by Makoto Kawaguchi.

Chart positions

References

External links
 
 

1980 singles
1980 songs
Pink Lady (band) songs
Japanese-language songs
Victor Entertainment singles